Kim Bo-young (born 1975) is a South Korean science fiction writer based in Gangwon Province, South Korea. In addition to her novels and short story collections, she has worked as a script advisor for Bong Joon-ho's Snowpiercer in 2013. She is the first Korean science fiction author to be published by HarperCollins.

Biography 
Kim was born in 1975. Her access to Western science fiction books was limited by military dictatorships into the early 1990s - as a result, the majority of her formative literary influences were from both mainstream literature and Korean manhwa. Before her career as an author, she worked as a screenwriter, game developer, and graphic designer for the Korean computer game developer Garam & Baram.

In 2004, her first published work of fiction, The Experience of Touch, won the inaugural Korean Science & Technology Creative Writing Award. She went on to win the annual South Korean SF Novel Award three separate times for The Seven Executioners (2013) in the novel category, The World's Fastest Person (2014) in the short story/novella category, and How Alike We Are (2017) in the short story/novella category.

Kim's short stories are often rooted in or inspired by significant flashpoints in Korean society, such as the Sewol ferry disaster, the victory of AlphaGo over Lee Sedol, and an incident informally dubbed 'Korean Gamergate' in which a voice actress for a prominent video game posted a photo of herself wearing a shirt with the words 'Girls Do Not Need a prince', which resulted in the actress losing her job.

Until recently, Kim was one of the few Korean science fiction authors to be translated into English, partially as a result of her short story publication in Clarkesworld Magazine. Kim's current works that have been translated into English are I'm Waiting for You (HarperVoyager, 2021, translated by Sophie Bowman and Sung Ryu) and On the Origin of Species and Other Stories (Kaya Press, 2021). On the Origin of Species and Other Stories, translated by Sora Kim-Russell and Joungmin Lee Comfort, was longlisted for the 2021 National Book Award for Translated Literature.

Selected works 

 Creation Myth, 2010
 The Seven Executioners, 2013
 The Prophet of Mundanity, 2017
 How Similar, 2020
 I'm Waiting for You, 2020

References 

Living people
1975 births
South Korean science fiction writers
South Korean women writers